The following is a list of awards and nominations received by Colombian singer and songwriter Maluma. He has released four studio albums. Maluma has won one Latin Grammy Award from eleven nominations, as well as an MTV Video Music Award, three MTV Europe Music Awards, and two Latin American Music Awards. He received the Spirit of Hope award at the 2020 Billboard Latin Music Awards for his foundation El Arte de los Sueños (The Art of Dreams).

He won the Latin Grammy Award for Best Contemporary Pop Vocal Album for his third studio album F.A.M.E. (2018). His fourth studio album 11:11 (2019) was nominated for Best Latin Pop Album at the 62nd Annual Grammy Awards. In 2019, he received the ASCAP Latin award for Songwriter of the Year.

Awards and nominations

Other awards
YouTube Play Button, 2017 (10,000,000 subscribers)

References

Maluma